Antje Huber (23 May 1924 – 30 September 2015) was a German politician who was the Federal Minister for Youth, Family and Health from 1976 to 1982. She served as a member of the Bundestag for the SPD between 1969 and 1987.

References

1924 births
2015 deaths
Politicians from Szczecin
People from the Province of Pomerania
Social Democratic Party of Germany politicians
20th-century German women politicians
Knights Commander of the Order of Merit of the Federal Republic of Germany
Female members of the Bundestag
Members of the Bundestag for North Rhine-Westphalia
Members of the Bundestag 1983–1987
Members of the Bundestag 1980–1983
Members of the Bundestag 1976–1980
Members of the Bundestag 1972–1976
Members of the Bundestag 1969–1972